Futbolo klubas Kauno Žalgiris (Football club Kauno Žalgiris) is a professional football club based in Kaunas, Lithuania, that competes in the A lyga, the top tier of Lithuania. The club was founded as FM Spyris Kaunas in 2004, became the football section of basketball club Žalgiris Kaunas and moved to their current stadium, the Darius and Girėnas Stadium, in 2015. After their debut season in the A Lyga, the club adopted the name FK Kauno Žalgiris in 2016.

History

2005–2014: Early years
The idea of professional club was raised by the Kaunas football school "Tauras" in 2004, when coaches of the school decided to give an opportunity for school graduates to continue their football careers professionally, this became a reality in 2005 when FM Spyris was formed. The club initially played in the LFF II league's southern division, wearing yellow and blue. On 1 May 2005, FM Spyris played their first official match, defeated 2–1 by FK Sveikata Kybartai. For a single season in 2010, FM Spyris was renamed to FM Aisčiai Kaunas, the team finished as runners-up. Despite struggling to get back on top of the league, by 2013, the club had moved up to the LFF I league and enjoyed a couple of competitive seasons and were competitive in the LFF Cup.

2015–present: Kauno Žalgiris
After their recent success, the club made it official that they would like to join the premier Lithuanian football league for the 2015 season, Spyris was accepted on the first check up. Before the season started it was announced that 6 new players will join the club Dzmitry Rekish, Giuseppe Palma (on loan from S.S.C. Napoli), Andrius Velička, Paulius Daukša, Klimas Gusočenko and Jevgenij Maroz. Prior to the start of the season, the club announced their cooperation with BC Žalgiris and plans of adapting the name Žalgiris. The name change would spark a controversy due to the fact another Lithuanian club FK Žalgiris Vilnius would also be competing in the league. The club from Vilnius would file a complaint under the basis of LFF regulations not allowing two teams being under the same name. On 1 March 2015, the club debuted in the A Lyga by defeating FK Klaipėdos Granitas 2–1 in Kaunas as FK Spyris Kaunas. The club's green and white kits would sport the name Žalgiris and the basketball club's logo, alongside the logo they used as FK Spyris. Spyris finished fifth in the league, also reached the Lithuanian Football Cup semi-final, but was defeated by Žalgiris Vilnius.
Before the start of the 2016 season, the club changed its name to FK Kauno Žalgiris, adapting the name of the namesake basketball club. Although the newly developing fan base were happy about it, the name change was shadowed by more legal issues with FK Žalgiris Vilnius, so the future of club's name was uncertain. The club started its preseason by signing a former Kaunas football school Tauras graduate Mantas Fridrikas. Later the club announced the oldest player on the team Audrius Kšanavičius was retiring, winger Jevgenij Moroz and one of the best 2015 A lyga players, Dzmitry Rekish, were leaving the club. After a brief spell of silence, the club announced the signings of three new players just before the beginning of the season who were former FK Šiauliai right back Ernestas Pilypas, Russian winger Leonid Mushnikov, who also was part of Šiauliai team from 2011 to 2013 and 2013 Lithuanian Footballer of the Year Mindaugas Kalonas whose career at that time was on a downfall.

The club signed a contract with 2016 Best I Lyga manager Vitalijus Stankevičius.

In 2020 season team won third place in A lyga. In 2021 season again won third place.

Stadium

The club played its home matches at the Darius and Girėnas Stadium, which has been closed down for a reconstruction in 2018. The stadium is a multi-use facility in Ąžuolynas park in the Žaliakalnis district of Kaunas, Lithuania. The all-seater stadium held 9,180 spectators. In 1998 it was renovated according to UEFA regulations, and in 2005 it was modernized with an installation of the biggest digital scoreboard in the Baltic states.

Currently the club uses the Kauno Žalgiris FA Stadium (until 2020 was named Sport School Tauras) from Kaunas as their stadium, after receiving a special dispensation for the Lithuanian Football Federation. The stadium has a capacity of 500.

Kit
 When the club was called FK Spyris, they wore yellow/blue (Yellow kits, blue shorts and blue socks).
 Since 2015, FK Žalgiris Kaunas's colours have been green and white. The kit is a green and white jersey, and the shorts and socks is a variation of green and white. 
 The Goalkeeper's kits were brown with black shorts and socks in the 2018 season. Currently, in the 2020 season, the goalkeeper's jersey is in blue.

Kit manufacturers and shirt sponsors

Crest
FK Kauno Žalgiris is using the same logo as BC Žalgiris. The logo design is a green and white shield with the sign "BC Žalgiris", a basketball, and the letter "Ž". The club's name commemorates the victorious Battle of Žalgiris (Battle of Grunwald) (The meanings of Žalgiris and Grunwald are both "green grove").

Honours

Lithuanian Championship:
A Lyga
1st place (0): 
2nd place (1): 2022
3rd place (2): 2020, 2021
Lithuanian Cup
Winners (0): 
Runners-up (0): 
Lithuanian Supercup
Winners (0): 
Runners-up (1): 2023

Rankings in Domestic competitions

European Competitions record

As of match played 14 July 2022

Notes
 QR: Qualifying round

Current squad

Out on loan

Technical staff

References

External links
  
 Facebook Kauno Žalgiris official page
 alyga.lt Kauno Žalgiris page
 Kauno Žalgiris page (lietuvosfutbolas.lt)

 
Football clubs in Lithuania
Football clubs in Kaunas
BC Žalgiris
2004 establishments in Lithuania
Association football clubs established in 2004